Tamara Mikhaylovna Smirnova (1935–2001) was a Soviet/Russian astronomer and a discoverer of minor planets and comets.

Career
From 1966 to 1988, Smirnova was a staff member of the Institute of Theoretical Astronomy at Leningrad. She is credited by the Minor Planet Center with the discovery of 135 numbered minor planets during 1966–1984. She also co-discovered the periodic comet 74P/Smirnova-Chernykh, along with Nikolai Stepanovich Chernykh.

The main-belt asteroid 5540 Smirnova, discovered by herself in 1971, was named in her honor following a proposal by the Institute of Theoretical Astronomy. Naming citation was published on 17 March 1995.

List of discovered minor planets

See also

References 
 

1935 births
2001 deaths
Soviet women scientists
Discoverers of asteroids
Discoverers of comets

Place of birth missing
Soviet astronomers
Women astronomers
Russian astronomers